Gates Lucas is a New Hampshire politician.

Education
Lucas graduated from Dartmouth College.

Career
On November 6, 2018, Lucas was elected to the New Hampshire House of Representatives where he represents the Sullivan 2 district. Lucas assumed office on December 5, 2018. Lucas is a Republican.

Personal life
Lucas resides in Sunapee, New Hampshire.

References

Living people
People from Sunapee, New Hampshire
Dartmouth College alumni
Republican Party members of the New Hampshire House of Representatives
21st-century American politicians
Year of birth missing (living people)